The 2014–15 FC Red Bull Salzburg season was the 82nd season in club history. Red Bull Salzburg finished the season as champions of the Bundesliga and the ÖFB-Cup for the second season in a row. In Europe, Salzburg where knocked out of the Champions League by Malmö in the playoff round, dropping into the Europa League where they reached the round of 32 before defeat to Villarreal.

Season events

Red Bull Salzburg come into the 2014–15 season as league and cup champions. Peter Ankersen and Benno Schmitz transferred to Red Bull Salzburg. Florian Klein and Marco Meilinger left the club. Eddie Gustafsson retired at the end of the 2013–14 season. Roger Schmidt left the club to become the head coach at Bayer Leverkusen. Adi Hütter was named Schmidt's replacement. Pre–season started on 16 June.

Nils Quaschner was sold during the January transfer window. However, FIFA didn't allow the transfer because he had played for two teams during the season. He had also played for FC Liefering. FIFA transfer rules don't allow player to player for more than two teams during a season.

Bundesliga

Matchdays 1–9

on 19 July, in the opening match of the league season, Red Bull Salzburg defeated Rapid Wien 6–1 with two goals from Jonathan Soriano and a goal each from Andreas Ulmer, Alan, Sadio Mané, and Kevin Kampl. Steffen Hofmann scored for Rapid Wien. Red Bull took a 2–0 first–half lead with a 30th-minute goal from Andreas Ulmer and a 40th-minute goal from Alan. Red Bull scored four more goals in the second–half with a 69th-minute goal from Sadio Mané, a 77th minute and 79th-minute goals from Jonathan Soriano, and an 85th-minute goal from Kevin Kampl. Steffen Hofmann scored for Rapid Wien from the penalty spot in stoppage time. Red Bull finished the opening round in first place. On 26 July, on matchday two, Red Bull defeated Wiener Neustadt 5–0 with two goals from Jonathan Soriano and a goal each from Marcel Sabitzer, Christian Schwegler, Kevin Kampl, and André Ramalho Silva. Marcel Sabitzer opened the scored in the 15th minute which gave Red Bull a 1–0 half–time lead. Then in the 47th minute, Jonathan Soriano scored his first goal of the match. Christian Schwegler and Kevin Kampl added to the lead in the 53rd and 55th minutes. Jonathan Soriano finished the scoring with a goal from the penalty spot in the 75th minute. Red Bull's Sadio Mané and Wiener Neustadt's Remo Mally were sent–off during the match. Red Bull finished the matchday in first place. Then on 2 August, on matchday three, Red Bull defeated Ried 2–0 with goals from Franz Schiemer and Massimo Bruno. Franz Schiemer opened the scoring in the 50th minute and Massimo Bruno added the other goal in stoppage time in the second–half. Franz Schiemer was also sent–off for a second yellow card. Red Bull finished the matchday in first place. On 10 August, on matchday four, Red Bull defeated Grödig 8–0 with five goals from Jonathan Soriano and a goal each from Sadio Mané, Marcel Sabitzer, and Valentino Lazaro. Jonathan Soriano's opened the scoring with his first goal in the 13th minute. Then Sadio Mané and Marcel Sabitzer scored two minutes apart in the 20th and 22nd minutes. Jonathan Soriano scored the next four goals in the 39th, 44th, 54th and 65th minutes. Valentino Lazaro finished the scoring in the 74th minute. Red Bull finished the matchday in first place. On 16 August, on matchday five, Red Bull defeated Admira Wacker 3–0 with goals from Massimo Bruno, Christian Schwegler, and Marcel Sabitzer. Massimo Bruno opened the scoring with a volley in the 24th minute. Christian Schwegler increased the lead to 2–0 in the 50th minute. Marcel Sabitzer completed the scoreline with a goal in the 74th minute. Red Bull finishedthe matchday in first place. On 23 August, on matchday six, Red Bull defeated Rheindorf Altach 5–0 with two goals from Alan and a goal each from Jonathan Soriano, Massimo Bruno, and Valentino Lazaro. The first goal of the match came when Jonathan Soriano scored from the penalty spot in the 12th minute. Massimo Bruno scored in the 16th minute and Alan scored in the 38th minute to give Red Bull a 3–0 first–half lead. Alan got his second goal of the match in the 77th minute and Valentino Lazaro scored in stoppage time to complete the 5–0 scoreline. Felix Roth was sent–off for Rheindorf Altach. Red Bull finished the matchday in first place. Red Bull suffered their first defeat of the season on matchday seven, on 30 August, with a 3–2 loss to Sturm Graz. Kevin Kampl and Jonathan Soriano scored for Red Bull. Sturm Graz got two goals from Marko Stanković and a goal from Marco Djuricin. Marko Stanković gave Sturm Graz a 2–0 lead with goals in the fourth and 14th minutes. Red Bull then equalized with a 35th-minute goal from Kevin Kampl and a 55th-minute goal from Jonathan Soriano. Then Marco Djuricin gave Sturm Graz a 3–2 lead in the 90th minute. Red Bull finished the matchday in first place. Then Red Bull lost to Wolfsberg 1–0 on matchday eight, on 14 September. Tadej Trdina scored in the 26th minute and Christopher Wernitznig was sent–off in the 44th minute for Wolfsberg. Red Bull finished the matchday in second place. Red Bull lost their third straight match when they lost to Austria Wien 3–2 on matchday nine, on 21 September. Alan gave Red Bull a 1–0 lead in the 31st minute. Marco Meilinger equalized in the 34th minute and David de Paula gave Austria the lead in the 38 minute. Alan equalized in the 68th minute with his second goal of the match. Omer Damari won the match for Austria in the 86th minute. Martin Hinteregger was sent–off. Red Bull finished the matchday in second place.

Matchdays 10–18
On matchday 10, on 28 September, Red Bull defeated Rapid Wien 2–1. Massimo Bruno gave Red Bull a 1–0 lead in the 84th minute. Alan put Red Bull up 2–0 in the 89th minute. Philipp Prosenik pulled one back in stoppage time for Rapid Wien. Red Bull finished the matchday in second place. Then on matchday 11, on 5 October, Red Bull defeated Wiener Neustadt 4–1 with goals from Peter Ankersen, Marcel Sabitzer, Jonathan Soriano, and Kevin Kampl. Herbert Rauter scored for Wiener Neustadt. Ankersen and Sabitzer put Red Bull up 2–0 with goals in the third and 22nd minutes. 10 minutes later, Rauter pulled a goal back for Weiner Neustadt. In the 78th minute, Soriano put Red Bull up 3–1 and Kampl finished the scoring with an 85th-minute goal to make it 4–1. Red Bull finished the matchday in second place. On matchday 12, on 18 October, Red Bull defeated Ried 4–2. Jonathan Soriano and Marcel Sabitzer scored two goals each for Red Bull and Denis Thomalla and Clemens Walch scored for Ried. Soriano opened the scoring in the 13th minute. Thomalla equalized for Ried 30 minutes later. Two minutes later, Soriano gave Red Bull the lead again. Red Bull led 2–1 at half–time. Walch equalized for Ried in the 62nd minute. Sabitzer scored a goal in the 84th minute and his second goal in stoppage time to put Red Bull up 4–2. Red Bull finished the matchday in first place. On matchday 13, on 26 October, Red Bull and Grödig battled to a 2–2 draw. Yordy Reyna opened the scoring for Grödig in the seventh minute. Kevin Kampl equalized 15 minutes later. Grödig regained the lead when Philipp Huspek scored from the penalty spot. Marcel Sabitzer finished the scoring in the 81st minute. Péter Gulácsi of Red Bull was sent–off. Red Bull finished the matchday in first place. On matchday 14, on 1 November, Red Bull defeated Admira Wacker 2–0 with two goals from Jonathan Soriano. Patrick Wessely of Admira Wacker was sent–off. Red Bull finished the matchday in first place. On matchday 15, on 9 November, Rheindorf Altach defeated Red Bull 4–1. Johannes Aigner, Ismael Shradi-Tajouri, Ivan Kovacec, and Louis Ngwat-Mahop scored for Altach and Massimo Bruno scored for Red Bull. Aigner opened the scoring in the fourth minute to give Altach a 1–0 lead. Then Bruno equalized for Red Bull in the 53rd minute. Shradi-Tajouri then put Altach in the lead again when he scored in the 62nd minute. Kovacec and Ngwat-Mahop scored in the last 10 minutes to give Altach a 4–1 win. Red Bull finished the matchday in first place. On matchday 16, on 23 November, Red Bull defeated Sturm Graz 2–1. Massimo Bruno and Jonathan Soriano scored for Red Bull and Marco Djuricin scored for Sturm Graz. The match, on matchday 17, on 30 November, between Red Bull and Wolfsberg finished in a 2–2 draw. Jonathan Soriano scored two goals for Red Bull and Christopher Wernitznig and Roland Putsche scored for Wolfsberg. Wolfsberg took a 2–0 lead when Wernitznig scored in the 28th minute and Putsche scored in the 66th minute. Soriano then scored in the 87th minute and stoppage time in the second half. Both of Soriano's goals were from penalty shots. Red Bull finished the matchday in first place. On matchday 18, on 6 December, Red Bull defeated Austria Wien 4–2. Red Bull got three goals from Alan and a goal from Marcel Sabitzer. Alexander Gorgon and Alexander Grünwald scored for Austria Wien. Austria Wien took a 2–0 lead when Gorgon scored in the seventh minute and Grünwald scored in the 20th minute. However, Alan scored in the 52nd, 58th, and 60th minutes to give Red Bull a 3–2 lead. Sabitzer made it 4–2 in the 68th minute. Thomas Salamon was sent–off for Austria Wien for a second bookable offence. Red Bull finished the matchday in first place.

Matchdays 19–27
On matchday 19, on 14 December, Red Bull lost to Rapid Wien 2–1. Marcel Sabitzer scored for Red Bull in the 84th minute. Robert Berić scored in the 80th minute and stoppage time in the second half. André Ramalho was sent–off for a second bookable offence. Red Bull finished the matchday in sixth place. On matchday 20, on 14 February, Red Bull defeated Wiener Neustadt 2–0 with two goals, in the 50th and 67th minutes, from Jonathan Soriano. Red Bull finished the matchday in first place. The match against Ried, on matchday 21, on 22 February, finished in a 2–2 draw. Felipe Pires gave Red Bull the lead in the 33rd minute. Then Denis Thomalla gave Ried a 2–1 lead when he scored two goals in the 53rd and 65th minutes. Naby Keïta equalized in the 69th minute.

Austrian Cup
On 12 July, in the first round of the Austina Cup, Red Bull Salzburg defeated 1. SC Sollenau 10–1 with four goals from  Alan, two goals from Jonathan Soriano, two goals from Marcel Sabitzer, and a goal each from Sadio Mané and Andreas Ulmer. Mané opened the scoring in the 19th minute. Then Alan picked up his first goal of the match in the 24th minute. Then Soriano got his brace in the 31st and 35th minute. Then Alan picked up his second goal of the match in the 36th minute. Milan Vukovič picked up Sollenau's goal in the 38th minute. Then Alan picked up his third and fourth goals of the match in the 62nd and 70th minutes. Sabitzer opened his scoring account in the 81st minute. Ulmer then got his goal in the 87th minute. Then Sabitzer finished his scoring account in the 89th minute. Then in the second round on 29 September, Red Bull Salzburg defeated Wiener Sportklub 12–1. Marcel Sabitzer opened the scoring in the sixth minute. Jonathan Soriano picked up his first goal of the match in the 21st minute before Rafael Pollack scored 11 minutes later. Alan's 35th-minute goal and Sabitzer's 37th-minute goal rounded up the scoring in the first half to put Red Bull Salzburg up 4–1. Red Bull Salzburg scored 8 more goals in the second half. The scoring started early in the second–half. Alan completed his hat–trick when he picked up goals in the 53rd and 55th minutes. Kevin Kampl scored in the 60th minute and Christoph Leitgeb scored in the 72nd minute. Soriano completed his brace with his 75th-minute goal. Massimo Bruno and Nils Quaschner got on the scoresheet with goals in the 80th and 86th minutes. Yannick Soura finished the scoring with an own goal. In the round of 16 on 29 October, Red Bull Salzburg defeated Wacker Innsbruck 2–1 in extra time. The 90 minutes finished 0–0. The only notable events in the 90 minutes were yellow cards to Massimo Bruno in the 74th minute and Jürgen Säumel in the 90th minute. Kevin Kampl opened the scoring in the 97th minute. Wacker equalized with a 107th-minute goal from Thomas Bergmann. A minute later, Ante Roguljić scored the winning goal.

UEFA Champions League
Red Bull Salzburg entered the third qualifying round and was drawn against the winner of the Valletta–Qarabağ fixture. Qarabağ won the fixture. The match took place on 30 July. The first leg was played on 30 July which Qarabağ won 2–1. The second leg was played on 6 August which Red Bull Salzburg won 2–0. Red Bull Salzburg was then drawn against Malmö for the play–off round. On 19 August, in the first leg, Red Bull Salzburg won 2–1. Franz Schiemer and Jonathan Soriano scored for Red Bull Salzburg and Emil Forsberg scored for Malmö. In the return leg, on 27 August, Red Bull Salzburg lost to Malmö 3–0 with two goals from Markus Rosenberg and another goal from Magnus Eriksson. Malmö was awarded a penalty shot after Péter Gulácsi brought down Eriksson. Rosenburg converted the penalty in the 11th minute. Eight minutes later, Eriksson scored from 30 meters out after Gulácsi was off his line. Rosenberg got his second goal of the match with 6 minutes of normal time remaining. Malmö won the tie with a 4–2 aggregate score.

UEFA Europa League

Group stage
Red Bull Salzburg were drawn into Group D with Celtic, Dinamo Zagreb, and Astra Giurgiu. On 18 September, in the first match in their Europa League campaign, Red Bull Salzburg and Celtic finished in a 2–2 draw. Alan and Jonathan Soriano scored for Red Bull Salzburg and Wakaso Mubarak and Scott Brown scored for Celtic. Red Bull Salzburg were behind twice in the match. Mubarak opened the scoring in the 14th minute. Alan then equalized with a deflected shot in the 36th minute. However, Celtic took the lead again after André Ramalho Silva "diverted" Brown's shot in the 60th minute. Soriano equalized with a free kick in the 78th minute. Red Bull Salzburg and Celtic finished the matchday tied for second place in the group. Then on 2 October, on matchday two, Red Bull Salzburg defeated Astra Giurgiu 2–1 Kevin Kampl and Jonathan Soriano. Takayuki Seto scored for Astra Giurgiu. Seto gave Astra Giurgiu the lead in the 15th minute. However, a 36th-minute goal from Kampl and a 42nd-minute goal from Soriano gave Red Bull Salzburg the victory. Red Bull Salzburg finished the matchday in first place. On 23 October, on matchday three, Red Bull Salzburg defeated Dinamo Zagreb 4–2. Red Bull Salzburg took a 4–0 lead through three goals by Alan and another goal by André Ramalho Silva. However, Dinamo Zagreb got two goals back from an 81st-minute goal from Arijan Ademi and an 89th-minute goal from Ángelo Henríquez. Red Bull Salzburg finished the matchday in first place. Then on 6 November, on matchday four, Red Bull Salzburg defeated Dinamo Zagreb 5–1. Red Bull Salzburg took a 2–0 lead through a 39th-minute goal from Soriano and 59th minute Kampl. However, a minute later, Ángelo Henríquez scored the lone goal for Dinamo Zagreb. However, Red Bull Salzburg would go on to score three more goals. Soriano collected his second goal of the match in the 64th minute, followed by Massimo Bruno's goal in the 72nd minute, and Soriano's third goal in the 85th minute. Red Bull Salzburg clinch a spot in the knockout round with the win. Red Bull Salzburg finished the matchday in first place. On matchday five, on 27 November, Red Bull Salzburg won Group D when they defeated Celtic 3–1. Celtic also went through despite the loss. Red Bull Salzburg got two goals from Alan and another goal from Naby Keïta. Stefan Johansen scored for Celtic. Red Bull Salzburg took a 2–0 lead when Alan scored in the eighth and 13th minutes. Johansen equalized in the 30th minute. Keïta scored the winning goal for Red Bull Salzburg in stoppage time. On matchday six, on 11 December, Red Bull Salzburg defeated Astra Giurgiu 5–1. Red Bull Salzburg got two goals each from Kevin Kampl and Alan a goal from Marcel Sabitzer. George Florescu scored for Astra Giurgiu. Sabitzer scored in the 9th minute and Kampl scored in the 34th minute to give Red Bull Salzburg a 2–0 first half lead. In less than a minute after the start of the second half, Alan scored to put Red Bull Salzburg up 3–0 Florescu pulled one back for Astra Giurgiu in the 51st minute. Alan scored his second goal of the match in the 70th minute and Kampl did likewise in stoppage time to make the 5–1. Red Bull Salzburg finished the group stage undefeated.

Knockout phase

The draw for the round of 32 took place on 15 December.  They went into the draw as group winners. Red Bull Salzburg were drawn against Villarreal. The first leg took place on 19 February. Villarreal won the match 2–1. Jonathan Soriano scored for Red Bull and Ikechukwu Uche and Denis Cheryshev scored for Villarreal. Uche opened up the scoring in the 32nd minute for Villarreal. Then Soriano equalized from the penalty spot in the 48th minute. Cheryshev scored the winning goal in the 54th minute.

Squad

Out on loan

Left during the season

Transfers

In

Loans in

Out

Loans out

Released

Competitions

Overview

Bundesliga

League table

Results summary

Results by round

Results

Austrian Cup

Final

UEFA Champions League

Qualifying rounds

UEFA Europa League

Group stage

Knockout phase

Statistics

Appearances and goals

|-
|colspan="14"|Players away on loan :
|-
|colspan="14"|Players who left Red Bull Salzburg during the season:

|}

Goal scorers

Clean sheets

Disciplinary Record

Notes

References

Red Bull Salzburg
FC Red Bull Salzburg seasons
Austrian football championship-winning seasons